The NCAA Division III women's volleyball tournament is the annual event that decides the championships in women's volleyball from teams in Division III contested by the NCAA each winter since 1981 except in 2020, when all D-III championship events were canceled due to COVID-19.

Washington University in St. Louis is the most successful program, with ten national titles. 

Juniata is the most recent champions, defeating Trinity (TX) in the 2022 final.

History
From 1970 through 1980, before the NCAA governed women's collegiate athletics, the Association for Intercollegiate Athletics for Women alone conducted the women's collegiate volleyball championships. 

Volleyball was one of twelve women's sports added to the NCAA championship program for the 1981-82 school year, as the NCAA engaged in battle with the AIAW for sole governance of women's collegiate sports. The AIAW continued to conduct its established championship program in the same twelve (and other) sports; however, after a year of dual women's championships, the NCAA conquered the AIAW and usurped its authority and membership.

The NCAA added a Division III men's championship in 2012, which at the time was the newest NCAA-sponsored championship. That distinction has since passed to the NCAA Beach Volleyball Championship, an all-divisions women-only championship launched in 2016.

Champions
See Association for Intercollegiate Athletics for Women Champions for the Division III volleyball champions from 1979 to 1981.  NOTE:  In 1981 there were both NCAA and AIAW champions.''

Records
 Most championships:  Washington University in St. Louis (10), UC San Diego (8)
 Undefeated Seasons:  Washington University in St. Louis (1992), Central (IA) (1999), Johns Hopkins (2019)

Summary

 Schools highlighted in pink are closed or no longer sponsor athletics.
 Schools highlight in yellow have reclassified to another NCAA division.

See also
 AIAW Intercollegiate Women's Volleyball Champions
 AVCA
 NCAA Women's Volleyball Championships (Division I, Division II)
 NCAA Men's Volleyball Championships (Divisions I and II, Division III)
 NAIA Volleyball Championship

References

External links
  NCAA Division III Women's Volleyball

Volleyball, Women's
 
Women's volleyball competitions in the United States
USA